Contemporary Jazz is a jazz album by the Branford Marsalis Quartet, featuring Branford Marsalis, Eric Revis, Jeff "Tain" Watts, and Joey Calderazzo which was recorded on December 1–4, 1999 at Bearsville Sound Studios near Woodstock, New York.

Reception

The album received the Grammy Award for Best Instrumental Jazz Performance, Individual or Group in 2000 and reached Number 12 on the Billboard Top Jazz Albums chart.

In his AllMusic review, David R. Adler calls the album "a knockout," saying the quartet "deftly [executes] a dizzying series of tempo shifts and subtle cues, all seamlessly worked into a fabric of extended, burning improvisation." Writing in JazzTimes, Willard Jenkins says that Marsalis "shows clear evidence that he's far from satisfied in his quest for excellence on his horns and with his composer's pen. Writing with an exceptional sense of rhythm in particular, Marsalis churns out an eight-chapter gem…" The BBC's ClassicalMusic.com called the album "packed with hard-driving, punchy, turn-on-a-dime quartet music, vigorously interactive and razor-sharp, yet pleasingly informal…hard-swinging, occasionally volcanic performances from a quartet at the peak of its powers."

Track listing

Personnel
 Branford Marsalis – Saxophones
 Eric Revis, bass
 Jeff "Tain" Watts, drums
 Joey Calderazzo, piano

References

External links
BranfordMarsalis.com

2000 albums
Branford Marsalis albums
Grammy Award for Best Jazz Instrumental Album